Anthony Lyons (born 9 February 1957) is a South African former cricketer. He played in two first-class and two List A matches for Border in 1981/82.

See also
 List of Border representative cricketers

References

External links
 

1957 births
Living people
South African cricketers
Border cricketers
People from Queenstown, South Africa
Cricketers from the Eastern Cape